The World Trade Center Metro Manila (WTCMM) is an exhibition center in Pasay, Metro Manila, Philippines.The first phase of venue was inaugurated by then President Fidel Ramos on October 28, 1996. The WTCMM is the first exhibition center in the Philippines to be listed by the UFI and is a member of the World Trade Centers Association.

It was used as the International Media Center for the APEC 2015. The center also hosted the fencing, karate, and wushu events at the 2019 Southeast Asian Games.

References

External links

Financial services companies of the Philippines
Convention and exhibition centers in Metro Manila
Philippines
Buildings and structures in Pasay
Buildings and structures completed in 1996
1996 establishments in the Philippines
20th-century architecture in the Philippines